The Scene Changes: The Amazing Bud Powell (Vol. 5), also known as The Amazing Bud Powell, Vol. 5: The Scene Changes, is a studio album by jazz pianist Bud Powell, released on Blue Note Records in 1959, featuring a session Powell recorded at the Van Gelder Studio in Hackensack, New Jersey on December 29, 1958, with Paul Chambers on bass and Art Taylor on drums.

The album was digitally remastered in 2003 by Rudy Van Gelder and re-issued as part of Blue Note's The RVG Edition series.

Track listing
All songs composed by Bud Powell.
"Cleopatra's Dream" – 4:22
"Duid Deed" – 5:06
"Down with It" – 3:58
"Danceland" – 3:41
"Borderick" – 1:58

"Crossin' the Channel" – 3:28
"Comin' Up" – 7:54
"Gettin' There" – 5:01
"The Scene Changes" – 3:59
"Comin' Up" [alternate take] – 5:26 (not on original LP)

Personnel

Performance
Bud Powell – piano
Paul Chambers – bass
Art Taylor – drums

Production
Bob Blumenthal – liner notes
Michael Boland - art direction and design
Michael Cuscuna – producer
Leonard Feather – liner notes
Gordan H. Jee - creative direction
Alfred Lion – producer, original session producer
Reid Miles – cover design
Rudy Van Gelder – recording engineer, mastering
Francis Wolff – photography, cover photo

References

Blue Note BLP 4009, Blue Note BST 84009, Blue Note 91897 (RvG edition)
BlueNote.com

Bud Powell albums
1958 albums
Albums produced by Alfred Lion
Blue Note Records albums
Albums recorded at Van Gelder Studio
Albums produced by Michael Cuscuna
Albums with cover art by Reid Miles
Sequel albums